Pitt Street Mall is the pedestrianised section of Pitt Street in the Sydney central business district, in the Australian state of New South Wales. Running for approximately 200 metres between Market Street and King Street, it is one block long and one of Australia's busiest and most cosmopolitan shopping precincts. Floorspace rents are the highest in Australia, in part due to other cities' shopping precincts being longer. In 2015, its rents were the fifth-highest in the world in terms of city streets.

Despite its small size, Pitt Street Mall hosts many flagship chain stores and more than 400 specialty stores. It is one of the flagship venues of Sydney Fashion Week held in the month of May.

History

Formerly a vehicular street, the mall was closed off to traffic in the 1990s and became a pedestrian mall. This was commonplace in various Australian cities at the time, in an effort to encourage "walk-in" business. Many prominent Australian businesses had flagship stores along Pitt Street, namely Sportsgirl and Angus & Robertson. In the mid 2000s, there were attempts to make the mall a completely pedestrian thoroughfare, diverting all vans and trucks to the underground corridor from King Street to Market Street, at the southern end of the mall.

2010–2011: redevelopment
Along with extensive upgrades to retail areas, the Pitt Street Mall's pedestrian area saw a A$10 million refurbishment during 2010-11. This included the provision of new seating as well as new pavers and a catenary lighting system.

Shopping centres and arcades
Five shopping centres and arcades are located on Pitt Street Mall:
 Westfield Sydney - Is a large, upmarket shopping centre which opened in stages from late 2010 to early 2011 and is the largest shopping centre in the CBD.
MidCity - Is a four level shopping centre and office building which opened in 2010.
 The Strand Arcade - Opened in 1891 and is the last remaining Victorian era arcade in the Sydney CBD. 
 Glasshouse - An office and retail building located on the end of Pitt Street Mall and King Street. Opened in 1990 and refurbished in 2015.
Sydney Arcade - An arcade originally built in 1882 and was demolished in 1954. It is currently small arcade located behind the heritage listed Victorian building located at the northern end of Pitt Street Mall.

Gallery

See also 
 List of shopping streets and districts by city

References 

Pedestrian malls in Australia
Shopping districts and streets in Australia
Sydney localities
Pitt Street, Sydney
Market Street, Sydney
King Street, Sydney